The following lists events that happened during 1983 in New Zealand.

Population
 Estimated population as of 31 December: 3,264,800
 Increase since 31 December 1982: 38,000 (1.18%)
 Males per 100 females: 98.6

Incumbents

Regal and viceregal
Head of State – Elizabeth II
Governor-General – The Hon. Sir David Beattie GCMG GCVO QSO QC.

Government
The 40th New Zealand Parliament continued. The third National Party government was in power.

Speaker of the House – Richard Harrison
Prime Minister – Robert Muldoon
Deputy Prime Minister – Duncan MacIntyre
Minister of Finance – Robert Muldoon
Minister of Foreign Affairs – Warren Cooper
Chief Justice — Sir Ronald Davison

Parliamentary opposition
 Leader of the Opposition –  David Lange (Labour).
Social Credit Party – Bruce Beetham

Main centre leaders
Mayor of Auckland – Colin Kay then Catherine Tizard
Mayor of Hamilton – Ross Jansen
Mayor of Wellington – Michael Fowler then Ian Lawrence
Mayor of Christchurch – Hamish Hay
Mayor of Dunedin – Cliff Skeggs

Events

1 January – The Closer Economic Relations Free trade agreement between Australia and New Zealand comes into force.
March – The Prince and Princess of Wales (Charles and Diana) visit New Zealand, bringing their baby son Prince William with them.
28 March – Deputy Prime Minister of Australia and Minister for Trade, Lionel Bowen and New Zealand High Commissioner to Australia, Laurie Francis sign the Closer Economic Relations agreement in Canberra, Australia.
1 July – 
 Lorraine Downes, Miss New Zealand, is crowned Miss Universe in St. Louis, Missouri, USA.
 The Official Information Act 1982 replaces the 1951 Official Secrets Act.
22 August – The New Zealand Party is launched.
1 September – Disappearance (and presumed death) of 14-year-old Kirsa Jensen.
The fourth Sweetwaters Music Festival is held near Pukekawa.
The visit of the United States nuclear-powered frigate Texas sparks widespread protests.
The first $50 notes are put into circulation, filling the large gap between the $20 and $100 notes.

Arts and literature
Rawiri Paratene wins the Robert Burns Fellowship.

See 1983 in art, 1983 in literature

Music

New Zealand Music Awards
Winners are shown first with nominees underneath. 
ALBUM OF THE YEAR  DD Smash – Live: Deep in the Heart of Taxes
Herbs – Light of the Pacific
Dance Exponents – The Legionnaires – Live at Mainstreet
SINGLE OF THE YEAR  DD Smash – "Outlook For Thursday"
Monte Video – "Shoop Shoop Diddy Wop Cumma Cumma Wang Dang"
Coconut Rough – "Sierra Leone"
TOP MALE VOCALIST  Dave Dobbyn (DD Smash)
Malcolm McNeill
Monte Video
TOP FEMALE VOCALIST  Suzanne Prentice
Trudi Green
Patsy
TOP GROUP OF THE YEAR  DD Smash
Herbs
The Narcs
MOST PROMISING MALE VOCALIST  Andrew Mclennan (Coconut Rough)
Dick Driver (Hip Singles)
Gary Smith (The Body Electric)
MOST PROMISING FEMALE VOCALIST  Sonya Waters
Rhonda Jones
Bronwyn Jones (Precious)
MOST PROMISING GROUP  Coconut Rough
Hip Singles
The Body Electric
BEST POLYNESIAN ALBUM  The Radars – Chulu Chululu
Patea Maori Club (featuring Dalvanius) – Poi E
Kaiwhaiki Cultural Club – The Valley of Voices Vol 2
BEST FILM SOUNDTRACK/ CAST RECORDING/ COMPILATION  Sharon O'Neill  – Smash Palace
Schtung – The Scarecrow
John Charles – Utu
BEST MUSIC VIDEO  Andrew Shaw – "Outlook For Thursday" (DD Smash)
Greg Rood – Sierra Leone (Coconut Rough)
Mark Ackerman, Craig Howard – "Shoop Shoop Diddy Wop Cumma Cumma Wang Dang" (Monte Video)
ENGINEER OF THE YEAR  Dave Marett – "Sierra Leone" (Coconut Rough)
Graeme Myhre – Live: Deep in the Heart of Taxes (DD Smash)
Paul Streekstra – "Outlook For Thursday" (DD Samsh)
PRODUCER OF THE YEAR  Dave Marett – "Sierra Leone" (Coconut Rough)
Dave Dobbyn – "Outlook For Thursday" (DD Smash)
Monte Video/ Bruce Lynch – "Shoop Shoop Diddy Wop Cumma Cumma Wang Dang" (Monte Video)
MOST POPULAR SONG  Patsy Riggir – "Beautiful Lady"
MOST POPULAR ARTIST  DD Smash
OUTSTANDING CONTRIBUTION  Murray Cammick
BEST COVER DESIGN  Simon & Suzy Clark – Daring Feats
Matthew Aitken – The Tin Syndrome
Van Heusen/ O'Neill-Joyce – Space Case Two
CLASSICAL RECORD OF THE YEAR  Louise Malloy – Louise
Kiri Te Kanawa/ National Youth Choir of New Zealand – Royal Occasion
Schools Polyphonics of Wellington – Tenebrae Responsorie 1585
JAZZ RECORD OF THE YEAR  Rodger Fox Big Band – Heavy Company
Space Case – Space Case Two
Phil Broadhurst – Sustenance
COUNTRY RECORD OF THE YEAR  Suzanne Prentice – When I Dream
Patsy Riggir – Are You Lonely
Brendan Duggan – Hands on the Wheel

See 1983 in music

Performing arts
 Benny Award presented by the Variety Artists Club of New Zealand to Russell Middlebrook.

Radio and television
Te Karere becomes a regular Māori language news program.
Northern Television ceases transmission.  
Feltex Television Awards:
Best Television Entertainer: Howard Morrison
Best Actor: Michael on Gliding On
Best Actress: Sarah Peirse on A Woman of Good Character
Best Drama: Gliding On
Best New Talent: Heath Lees on Opus and Kaleidoscope
Best Entertainment: McPhail and Gadsby
Best Documentary: Wild South – Black Robin
Best Information: Country Calendar
Best Speciality: Kaleidoscope
Best News and Current Affairs: Close Up
Best Script: Protesters
Steve Hosgood Award for Allied Craft: Errol Samuelson, film sound operator on	National History Programmes

See: 1983 in New Zealand television, 1983 in television, List of TVNZ television programming, :Category:Television in New Zealand, :Category:New Zealand television shows, Public broadcasting in New Zealand

Film
Bad Blood
Hang on a Minute Mate!
Merry Christmas, Mr. Lawrence
Patu!
Strata
Savage Islands
Utu

See: :Category:1983 film awards, 1983 in film, List of New Zealand feature films, Cinema of New Zealand, :Category:1983 films

Sport

Athletics
 Graham Macky wins his first national title in the men's marathon, clocking 2:21:22 in Mosgiel, while Val Lindsay does the same in the women's championship (3:11:35).

Basketball
 NBL won by Auckland

Cricket
 World Series Cup, New Zealand finished first in the preliminary stages of this annual triangular one-day competition in Australia, which in 1982/83 received unprecedented interest and record television audiences. England missed out on a finals berth, with Australia coming qualifying second.

New Zealand's star allrounder, Richard Hadlee, tore a hamstring on the eve of the lucrative and much anticipated finals series with Australia and was forced out of the side. A demoralised New Zealand were then well beaten by the rejuvenated Australians, 2–0. Lance Cairns hit his memorable 6 sixes in front of 71, 000 in the second final at the MCG.

Glenn Turner made his long-awaited international comeback in this series after six years of self-imposed exile from the New Zealand team due to a financial disagreement with the NZCC.

In February, New Zealand whitewashed England 3–0 in the Rothmans Cup one-day series in Christchurch, Wellington and Auckland, witnessed by sell-out crowds. Sri Lanka was then convincingly beaten in both the test and one-day series at home to cap off a memorable summer of cricket.

In July history was made when the Geoff Howarth-led side won their first test match against England in England, with a five wicket victory in the second test at Headingley in Leeds. However, they lost the four match series 1–3. Prior to this series, New Zealand played in the 1983 World Cup. In a tough group with both England and Pakistan, New Zealand narrowly missed out on a semi-final place at the World Cup for the first time, after being successful in the two prior tournaments in 1975 and 1979. Glenn Turner retired from international cricket after New Zealand's exit.

Horse racing

Harness racing
 New Zealand Trotting Cup: Steel Jaw
 Auckland Trotting Cup: Armalight

Thoroughbred racing
Kiwi wins a memorable 1983 Melbourne Cup at Flemington in a last-to-first finish in the home straight.

Netball
 The 6th Netball World Championships were held in Singapore. New Zealand lost to Australia in the final.

Shooting
Ballinger Belt – Rex Chilcott (Clevedon)

Soccer
 New Zealand National Soccer League won by Manurewa
 The Chatham Cup is won by Mount Wellington who beat Gisborne City 2–0 in the final.

Births
 18 January: George Bridgewater, rower
 19 January: Glen Moss, association football player
 24 January: Wyatt Crockett, rugby union player
 27 January: Dene Halatau, rugby league player
 8 February  James Ryan, (rugby player) Cory Jane, rugby union player
 13 February: Bradley Shaw, field hockey player
 1 March: James Mortimer, (athlete) hurdler
 2 March: Dan Wootton, journalist and broadcaster
 16 March: Melody Cooper, field hockey player
 1 April: Tamati Ellison, rugby union player 
 1 April: Lance Hohaia, rugby league player
 7 April: Allan Pearce, association football player
 15 April: Anna Scarlett, netballer
 25 April: Nick Willis, athlete
 30 April: David Faiumu, rugby league player
 5 May: Ben Atiga, rugby union player
 22 May: Jeremy Christie, association football player
 6 June: Joe Rokocoko, rugby union player
 10 June: Gavin Williams, rugby union player
 17 June: James Dolphin, athlete
 29 June: Jimmy Gopperth, rugby union player
 6 July: Brent Fisher, association football player
 10 August: Rebecca Scown, rower
 19 August: Tania Nolan, actress
 28 August: Luke McAlister, rugby union player
 7 September: Piri Weepu, rugby union player
 8 September: Toni Street, television presenter and sports commentator
 15 September: Richard Sherlock, cricketer
 28 September: John Schwalger, rugby union player
 17 October: Michelle Ang, actor
 18 October: Jonny Reid, motor racing driver
 8 November: Chris Rankin, actor
 29 November: Jeremy Mayall, composer
 2 December: Michael Wesley-Smith, actor
 15 December: Brooke Fraser, singer-songwriter
 20 December: Aaradhna, hip-hop artist

Deaths
 7 January: Eliza Amy Hodgson, botanist
 15 June: Sir William Liley, pioneering surgeon.
 23 July (in Sydney): Tex Morton, musician.
 12 August: Giff Vivian, cricketer.
 26 October: Edward Blaiklock, academic.
 29 November: Sir William Stevenson, industrialist and philanthropist.
 8 December: Sir Keith Holyoake, former Prime Minister.
 19 December: Lancelot Eric Richdale''', ornithologist.

See also
List of years in New Zealand
Timeline of New Zealand history
History of New Zealand
Military history of New Zealand
Timeline of the New Zealand environment
Timeline of New Zealand's links with Antarctica

References

External links

 
New Zealand
Years of the 20th century in New Zealand